Jason McElwain, nicknamed J-Mac (born October 20, 1988), is an American amateur athlete in both basketball and marathon and public speaker with high-functioning autism. McElwain came to fame on international news in 2006, when he shocked the world playing in a high-school basketball game and scored twenty points in the final few minutes of the game. The game was described as a “miracle” by many in attendance. The game was shown on ESPN, CBS, CNN and many news networks around the world, and video clips of the feat when viral.

In 2003, Jason McElwain was appointed as the manager of the Greece Athena High School Trojans men's basketball team by basketball coach Jim Johnson. On February 15, 2006, he played in a senior night basketball game against Spencerport High School, for a division title. Greece Athena got a large lead, so Coach Johnson decided to let McElwain play in the last four minutes and nineteen seconds of the game. After initially missing two shots, J-Mac became "hot as a pistol". McElwain made six three-point shots and one two-pointer, finishing with twenty points. Every shot he made shocked staff, students and parents alike. After the final buzzer rang, the crowd dashed onto the court in celebration. Footage of the event was featured on ESPN days after the game, and a short film about McElwain's life was in production. The movie, The Magic Of J-Mac, released in 2009.

Ten years later, McElwain made his professional basketball debut with the Rochester Razorsharks.

Early life
Jason McElwain was born on October 20, 1988, to David and Debbie McElwain, and was diagnosed with autism at the age of two years. Jason and his family lived in Greece, New York, a suburb of Rochester, New York. He initially struggled when interacting with other children, but began to develop social skills as he grew older. Although he was placed in special education classes, McElwain enjoyed basketball, to which he was introduced by his older brother Josh, and was appointed manager of Greece Athena High School's varsity basketball team. He was given the nickname “J-Mac”, after former Syracuse player Gerry McNamara who had the nickname “G-Mac”.

February 15, 2006, basketball game
Greece Athena High School basketball coach Jim Johnson decided to add McElwain to the roster for the team's February 15 game against Spencerport High School, so McElwain could be given a jersey and sit on the bench for the team's last home game of the season, and allow McElwain to play a few minutes if Greece Athena got a comfortable lead. With four minutes left in the game, Greece Athena had a double-digit lead, so Johnson decided to let McElwain play out the last minutes of the game. When teammates first passed the ball to McElwain he attempted a three-point shot and missed. McElwain got a second chance to score with a lay-up which he also missed. McElwain then got "hot as a pistol", sinking six three-pointers and one two-point shot, before the game ended. The final score was Greece Athena 79, Spencerport 43. As soon as the final buzzer rang, fans from the stands stormed the court in celebration. Johnson described the celebration at the end of the game as “living the movie Rudy”. 

McElwain's performance was videotaped by fellow Greece Athena student Marcus Luciano, who was substituting for the team's normal videographer. Before the game, Johnson gave Luciano strict instructions to track only the game formations. However, according to ESPN writer Elizabeth Merrill, Luciano "had a well-deserved reputation for breaking the rules"; when he saw McElwain make his first shot, he ignored Johnson's instructions and instead panned the crowd reaction to McElwain's performance. Johnson was initially angry, but he soon changed his mind, calling Luciano's decision "a brilliant move".

Reaction
Teacher Andy McCormack was in the audience that night to see the game. McCormack was Jason's Speech/Language Pathologist throughout high school, and the day after the game he got a copy of the video to local sports newscaster John Kucko who put it on the news that night. Others followed suit, and within days the tape reached a national audience. McCormack continued to support Jason over the next few months in school, helping coin alternative language expressions to his now-famous "hot as a pistol" phrase and helping him construct an introduction speech when Magic Johnson came to Greece Athena to speak to the student body.

In his hometown of Greece, New York, McElwain quickly became a celebrity. The family's home phone was always ringing, and when the McElwains went out for a meal, a group of fans ran into the family, praising Jason.

Jason's speech pathologist, Andy McCormack, sent the video footage of the game to John Kucko of local TV station WROC-TV on February 16.

Kucko, with given permission, then sent the story out nationally to CNN the day after. Another local TV station sent their report to CBS News.

Days later, the game made international headlines, from BBC News and Daily Telegraph in the United Kingdom to The Age in Australia to Scoop in New Zealand.

McElwain met President George W. Bush on March 14, 2006, when Bush stopped by a nearby airport on his way to Canandaigua, New York, so he could meet McElwain. Standing next to McElwain, Bush told reporters "As you can see, a special person has greeted us at the airport, Jason", and then jokingly asked "Can I call you J-Mac?" Bush went on to praise McElwain, saying "Our country was captivated by an amazing story on the basketball court. It's the story of a young man who found his touch on the basketball court, which, in turn, touched the hearts of citizens all around the country." Bush also stated that upon seeing McElwain on television, he "wept, just like a lot of other people did".
Indianapolis Colts quarterback Peyton Manning visited Rochester, where he was introduced to McElwain. Manning invited McElwain and Steve Kerr, another Greece Athena High School athlete to the Colts' training camp for a week, which McElwain accepted. McElwain later said that Peyton was "one of the nicest guys in sports" and when the Colts won the Super Bowl and Manning raised the Vince Lombardi Trophy, McElwain "had a tear in [his] eye."

McElwain threw out the opening pitch for the Rochester Red Wings' game against the Charlotte Knights. The Red Wings also gave away 3,500 free bobblehead dolls that were modeled after McElwain.

McElwain won an ESPY Award for the Best Moment in Sports in 2006. McElwain beat out Kobe Bryant's 81-point-game and the George Mason Patriots' run to the Final Four. The speech that Jason gave upon winning the award was written for him by his older brother. The theme of the speech was about dreams coming true. In addition to the many celebrities McElwain met, he also appeared on various talk shows, including The Oprah Winfrey Show, Larry King Live, Good Morning America and Today.

In 2007, Topps trading cards produced a Jason McElwain card as part of its retro-themed Allen & Ginter set.

In 2009, he appeared in a commercial for Gatorade as part of their "What is G?" ad campaign. The commercial aired during the Super Bowl.

McElwain appeared on The Talk in April 2011 as part of the show's month-long series on autism awareness. He told the hosts he was head coach of the 17U East Coast Fusion AAU basketball team. His memorable video surfaced once more in 2011, when Facebook users shared a 2006 story featured on CBS Evening News.

Radio
Jason had a song dedicated to him and his accomplishments on the court by an artist named Iron Butter. Jason also did several interviews and appeared at the Summerjam concert where his song was performed.

Book
Following his rise to fame, Jason McElwain wrote a book titled The Game of My Life. The book is written mainly by Jason, but includes sections written by his family, coach, and teammates. The Game of My Life is 243 pages long and was published on February 5, 2008, by New American Library. Editorial reviews were left by celebrities such as Magic Johnson, Doug Flutie, Rodney Peete, Holly Robinson Peete, and Tony Dungy. The book was co-written by Daniel Paisner.

Movie
As soon as late February 2006, Jason McElwain and his family started receiving inquiries from over 25 film companies, including The Walt Disney Company and Warner Bros., about making his story into a biopic. In April 2006, Columbia Pictures was reported to have bought the rights to produce the film. Laura Ziskin, producer of the Spider-Man film series, was signed on to produce it. Magic Johnson was attached as producer, while two-time Academy Award winner Alvin Sargent was in talks to write the script.

As of 2022, there are no new updates on the movie.

Life after high school
McElwain completed his GED courses and planned to go to college, and has a full-time job at Wegmans Food Markets in Greece, New York. Jason is often seen, too, at the local Olympia Family Restaurant, in Greece, New York. Occasionally, customers recognize him and ask for an autograph. McElwain also travels across the United States to help raise funds for autism research and to make media appearances. With all the activity that is going on his life, Jason admitted that he hasn't been playing as much basketball, but says that, "Occasionally, I'll go and shoot baskets at the YMCA." McElwain is also involved in public speaking, including an October 2011 speech at the Jefferson Rehabilitation House's annual dinner. Since 2007, McElwain has also been a volunteer coach for the Greece Athena team alongside Johnson.

In April 2016, the Rochester Razorsharks, a professional minor-league basketball team, signed McElwain to a one-day contract for their regular season finale against the Western New York Thundersnow. With the Razorsharks leading by more than 40 points late in the game, McElwain was put in and scored 10 points, including 2 three-point shots.

McElwain is also an accomplished runner. On September 23, 2012, McElwain completed the MVP Health Care Rochester Marathon in 15th place in 3 hours, 1 minute and 41 seconds, a time that qualified him for the Boston Marathon. In 2014, he completed the Boston Marathon in 2:57.05.

June 13, 2022 injury

On June 13, 2022, McElwain sustained a collapsed lung, several broken ribs and lacerations after he rode his bicycle into the path of an oncoming motor vehicle. Police do not intend to press charges against McElwain or the motorist. He was still recovering from his injuries three months later.

Similar basketball games

Since 2006, many high schools have adapted the same idea, inserting students with disabilities into games, especially on senior night, some of which also produced spectacular results. 

Others inspired by McElwain were Josh Titus and Patrick Thibodeau, who on the same night in 2009 were told by their coaches to check into their games for playing time, with both athletes producing results very similar to McElwain's. Another example was Mitchell Marcus of Coronado High School, who in 2013 made a layup after a last-gasp act of kindness from Johnathan Montanez, who was on the opposing team.

In 2015, 13-year old Eagles Landing Middle School student Jamarion Styles, who is armless, entered a high-school basketball game and hit 2 3-pointers, resulting in the players storming the court and lifting Jamarion on their shoulders.

References

External links

Bush Visits Autistic Teen Hoop Star (CBS News)
Article and video (CBS - The Early Show)
Full Video of Shots (MSNBC)
The Word in Greece (ESPN article)

Complete transcript of McElwain's conversation with President Bush

1988 births
American men's basketball players
American male marathon runners
Basketball players from New York (state)
Greece Athena High School alumni
Living people
People from Greece, New York
People on the autism spectrum
Point guards
Sportspeople from Rochester, New York
New York (state) Republicans